Eusarca fundaria, the dark-edged eusarca, is a species of geometrid moth in the family Geometridae.

The MONA or Hodges number for Eusarca fundaria is 6933.

References

Further reading

 

Ourapterygini
Articles created by Qbugbot
Moths described in 1858